Gary Browne (born 17 January 1983) is a former footballer, last playing for Ards.

External links

NIFG profile

1983 births
Living people
Association football forwards
NIFL Premiership players
Manchester City F.C. players
Northern Ireland under-21 international footballers
Association footballers from Northern Ireland
Expatriate footballers in England
People from Dundonald, County Down
English Football League players
Whitby Town F.C. players
York City F.C. players
Linfield F.C. players
Glentoran F.C. players
Lisburn Distillery F.C. players
RKSV Leonidas players
Carrick Rangers F.C. players
Ards F.C. players
Coleraine F.C. players